The ports of the Ottoman Empire can be listed by using the Ottoman Empire official annuals, known as salname, after 1847. The list below is about the ports of the empire in 1870.  According to the report there were 70 ports (including piers). Among these 3 of them were in Adriatic Sea, 2 in Ionian Sea, 6 in Aegean Sea, 9 in Sea of Marmara, 32 in Mediterranean Sea, 11 in Black Sea, 5 in Red Sea, and 2 in Persian Gulf. (However, in this list Aegean island ports as well as Anatolian ports facing the Aegean Sea were listed together with the Mediterranean ports)

Notes

Ottoman Empire
Ottoman Empire-related lists